Cave of Outlaws is a 1951 American Western film directed by William Castle and starring Macdonald Carey and Alexis Smith. It was also known as The Cave.

Plot
In 1880, Pete Carver is part of a gang that robs a train of gold. They flee to a cave, where a posse chases and kills all of them except Pete, who insists he does not know where the gold is. Pete is sent to prison. Fifteen years later, Pete is let out of prison. He is tracked by Wells Fargo agent Dobbs who believe Pete will go and find the gold.

Cast
 Macdonald Carey as Pete Carver
 Alexis Smith as Elizabeth Trent
 Edgar Buchanan as Dobbs
 Victor Jory as Ben Cross
 Hugh O'Brian as Garth
 Houseley Stevenson as Cooley
 Hugh Sanders as Sheriff
 Raymond Bond as Doc
 Robert Osterloh as Blackjack

Production
The film was based on original story by Elizabeth Wilson of Arizona. She also wrote the script. Filming was to have begun in February 1951 with Howard Duff in the lead. Duff injured his leg and was replaced by Macdonald Carey. The start date was pushed back to 26 March 1951.

The cave scenes were shot at the Carlsbad Caverns National Park in New Mexico in April. The caves remained open to the general public during the day and the unit filmed at night.

Castle wrote that "we lived underground like moles" and that "there was little excitement about the whole project."

References

External links
 
 
 

1951 films
American Western (genre) films
1951 Western (genre) films
Universal Pictures films
Films directed by William Castle
1950s English-language films
1950s American films